= MHP Standing Together =

MHP Standing Together (Ukrainian: МХП Поруч) is a charitable foundation focused on the reintegration and readaptation of military veterans in Ukraine.

In 2023, the foundation MHP Standing Together received the International Business Culture Award as the best corporate social responsibility initiative. The foundation provides individual support and comprehensive assistance to servicemen, veterans, their families, and those waiting for loved ones to return from the front.

== History ==
The charitable foundation founded in May 2023 to support servicemen, veterans, their families, and those awaiting the return of loved ones from the front.

In October 2023, with the foundation's support, ACMP Ukraine released a leadership guide titled "Veteran Adaptation" aimed at helping managers effectively support veteran employees. In autumn 2023, MHP launched its own Center for Interaction with Servicemen and Veterans, providing personalized assistance and comprehensive support from the beginning of military service through reintegration into civilian life.

In January 2024, MHP's strategic partner, the charitable foundation "MHP – Hromadi", signed a memorandum of cooperation with Veteran Hub, focusing on reintegration, psychological support, and grants for veterans launching their own businesses.

In March 2024, the foundation partnered with Veteran Hub in developing support groups for individuals awaiting loved ones from the front lines. In April 2024, the foundation initiated the creation of an ESG Committee on veteran policy within the European Business Association, bringing together stakeholders from both the public and private sectors.

== Activity ==
The foundation supports defenders and their families both during military service and after returning from war. This includes humanitarian aid to military units, treatment and rehabilitation, legal and psychological support, social reintegration, and professional adaptation.

A dedicated Center for Interaction with Servicemen and Veterans operates systematically, along with a free hotline available 24/7.

Additional support for servicemen is provided by a cross-functional team of more than 30 specialists, uniting representatives of HR, CSR, security departments, occupational safety, psychologists, lawyers, health and rehabilitation experts, and vocational training specialists.

=== Support for Veteran Entrepreneurship ===
Since 2023, the foundation, together with its strategic partner the charitable foundation MHP-Hromadi, has supported grant competitions for veteran entrepreneurs and their families. These include programs such as: #Varto "Do Your Own Thing" (#Варто «РобиТИ своє»), "Do Your Own Thing" («Роби своє»), "Do Your Own Thing with Kurator" («Роби своє з Kurator»), and "Support for Microenterprises of War Veterans and Their Families – from Idea to Implementation in Vinnytsia region", among others.

=== Partnership with the State and Communities ===
In November 2023, the Veteran Hub PATRIOT opened in Kaniv, Cherkasy region, offering psychological and legal services, as well as employment support. The space hosts events for veterans, female veterans, their families, and families of the fallen.

In March 2024, a veteran center began operating in the Lviv region, providing professional legal and psychological consultations to visitors. In February 2024, a rehabilitation hall was opened at the Myronivka Hospital for Restorative Treatment in the Kyiv region. There, servicemen, veterans, and their families can receive treatment and rehabilitation after injuries and wounds.
